Clepsis ecclisis is a species of moth of the family Tortricidae. It is found in Guatemala and Panama.

The wingspan is about 19 mm. The forewings are fawn to fawn-grey with fawn-brown transverse lines. The hindwings are whitish-grey.

References

Moths described in 1914
Clepsis